"No Truck Song" is a song co-written and recorded by Canadian country artist Tim Hicks. The track was co-written by Bruce Wallace and Jeff Coplan who produced the track. The track is the lead single off Hicks' EP Wreck This.

Background
Hicks said: "On every album I usually add one or two songs that are a little tongue-in-cheek, designed to give fans (and me!) a chuckle, but we’ve never released one as a single before. We smiled and laughed a lot while we wrote it, so I hope fans hear that, and it makes them do the same".

Commercial performance
"No Truck Song" was certified Gold by Music Canada on October 7, 2020, with over 40,000 sales. It reached a peak of #1 on the Billboard Canada Country chart dated July 4, 2020, marking Hicks' second chart-topper. It also reached a peak of #71 on the Canadian Hot 100, and #40 on the Australian TMN Country Hot 50.

Music video
The official music video for "No Truck Song" premiered on March 4, 2020 and was directed by Adam Rothlein.

Charts

Certifications

References
 

2020 songs
2020 singles
Tim Hicks songs
Open Road Recordings singles
Songs written by Tim Hicks